Vedat Taylan Yıldız (nicknamed as  [lit. meaning "elder brother who provides internet"]) is a member of the Good Party group in the Municipal Council of Istanbul. He started working at Google after studying at Boğaziçi and Stanford Universities. He returned to Turkey to support the opposition in 2017 constitutional referendum.

He learned to read and write at an early age and started primary school in Izmir. Then he studied at İzmir Karşıyaka Anatolian High School and İzmir Science High School respectively. Yıldız, who graduated from Boğaziçi University in 2001, completed his master's degree in industrial engineering at Massachusetts University. In 2003, he was accepted into the marketing program of Stanford University's PhD in business administration. When he returned Turkey in 2017 in order to contribute to "no campaign", he joined IYI Party as a founder and became the vice chairman of the party.

References 

1980 births
Living people
Good Party politicians